Haji Laq Laq (1898–1961), born Ata Muhammad, was a humorist, Urdu poet and journalist of the Indian subcontinent. He was commonly known as Haji Laq Laq, and also used Laq Laq as a Takhalus (penname).

Biography
Haji Laq Laq was born in 1898 in Patti, Amritsar, India. He was belonged to a well educated family. He wrote humorous poetry and also served on newspapers including Zamindar, Shahbaz and Ehsan. He served in the British Indian Army before dedicating himself to literary activities. Shorish Kasmiri has offered tribute to Haji Laqlaq in "No Ratan" and elaborated how these personalities merged literary skills in journalism. After partition he remained attached to weekly "chattan" of Agha Shorish Kashmiri and also wrote his autobiography "Sargozasht".

He was a mureed (disciple) of Maulana Nawab ud din Ramdasi (R.A) and he also used chishti after his name due to spiritual devotion. Haji Laq Laq died on 28 September 1961 in Lahore, Pakistan.

He had only one son, whose name is Abdur Rasheed Chishti and was in the British Indian Army like Haji Laq laq and also served in Second World War. Abdur Rasheed Chishti died on 1998 in Lahore, Pakistan.

References

1898 births
1961 deaths
Pakistani humorists
20th-century Pakistani poets
Pakistani male poets
Writers from Amritsar